Dorsett is a surname. Notable people with the surname Dorsett include:

 Anthony Dorsett (born 1973), American and Canadian football player, son of Tony Dorsett
 David J. Dorsett (born 1956), United States Navy vice admiral
 Derek Dorsett (born 1986), Canadian ice hockey player
 Dicky Dorsett (1919–1999), English footballer
 Georgina Dorsett, British actress
 Nikolas Dorsett (born 1998), American rapper 
 Katie G. Dorsett (1932–2020), American politician
 Martha Angle Dorsett (1851–1918), American lawyer
 Phillip Dorsett, (born 1993), American football player
 Tony Dorsett (born 1954), American football player